Songzhu Temple is a folk religion temple located in Beitun District, Taichung, Taiwan. Built in 1833, the temple is dedicated to a specific Guanyin statue known as "Waterflow Guanyin".

History 
According to legend, in the summer of 1830, a Guanyin statue carried by a flood got stuck in a bamboo forest at the site of the current temple. After the water settled, a group of children found the statue and began worshiping it in the forest. Afterwards, a woman was having a difficult childbirth when a passing midwife came to help. As a token of appreciation, the woman promised to visit the midwife's home in the future. However, the midwife's directions led her to the bamboo forest. Through poe divination, the Guanyin revealed that she was the midwife. Therefore, a temple was built to house the statue in 1833, and the Waterflow Guanyin became a deity for safe pregnancies.

A 20 m tall fiberglass statue of Guanyin was erected in 1988. During Typhoon Haitang in 2005, the statue fell over and was destroyed, which was interpreted as the Guanyin sacrificing itself for the people. The statue has since been restored.

Filial piety tree 
In the temple's courtyard, there is a sea fig tree that is thought to be more than 160 years old. The 15 m tree has two main trunks, giving it the nickname "filial piety tree" (孝子樹). The tree is listed as one of Taichung's protected trees.

On 2 June 2013, the larger of the two trunks cracked from earthquake damage, causing the trunk to tip over. The tree is repaired and is supported by I-beams.

Gallery

Notes

References 

1833 establishments in Taiwan
Religious buildings and structures completed in 1833
Buddhist temples in Taiwan
Temples in Taichung